Hypoctonus is a genus of Thelyphonid whip scorpions, first described by Tamerlan Thorell in 1888.

Species 
, the World Uropygi Catalog accepts the following nineteen species:

 Hypoctonus andersoni (Oates, 1889) – Myanmar
 Hypoctonus binghami (Oates, 1889) – Myanmar
 Hypoctonus birmanicus Hirst, 1911 – Myanmar
 Hypoctonus browni Gravely, 1912 – Myanmar
 Hypoctonus carmichaeli Gravely, 1916 – Bangladesh
 Hypoctonus dawnae Gravely, 1912 – Myanmar
 Hypoctonus ellisi Gravely, 1912 – Myanmar
 Hypoctonus formosus (Butler, 1872) – Myanmar
 Hypoctonus gastrostictus Kraepelin, 1897 – Borneo
 Hypoctonus granosus Pocock, 1900 – China
 Hypoctonus javanicus Speijer, 1933 – Indonesia
 Hypoctonus kraepelini Simon, 1901 – Thailand
 Hypoctonus oatesii Pocock, 1900 – Bangladesh, Bhutan
 Hypoctonus rangunensis (Oates, 1889) – Myanmar
 Hypoctonus saxatilis (Oates, 1889) – Myanmar
 Hypoctonus siamensis Haupt, 1996 – Thailand
 Hypoctonus stoliczkae Gravely, 1912 – India
 Hypoctonus sylvaticus (Oates, 1889) – Myanmar
 Hypoctonus woodmasoni (Oates, 1889) – Myanmar

References 

Arachnid genera
Uropygi